PESC Information Systems College is an education facility in Ethiopia which uses distance education to teach Information systems.

The college started in order to offer  distance education programs that focused on Information Systems and Technology through the adoption of new way of learning in the country using a virtual education system modified. The system consists of classroom lectures with practical demonstrations and electronic library service delivery from one central distant site to students on the periphery using video, animations and graphics. The education method provides modules in text form, and lectures in CD ROM format, to students for home use by VCD players, TV sets, and computers at home or office. The college's aim is to deliver education from a distance to the people of Ethiopia through the use of Information and Communication Technology (ICT). The college extends the reach of ICT education into communities with a shortage of professionals in ICT.
Website

Universities and colleges in Ethiopia
Distance education in Africa